Andrew Nuñez (born November 30, 1935) is an American Politician who was a former Republican member of the New Mexico House of Representatives. A farmer, Nuñez attended New Mexico State University and received a Bachelor of Science and masters of science degree in animal science.

Nuñez was a Democratic member of the House of Representatives from 2001 until he switched his affiliation to Independent in 2011 and lost reelection the following year in a three-candidate race to Phillipp Archuleta. Nuñez ran as a Republican in 2014 and was returned to the New Mexico House of Representatives as the New Mexico Republican Party gained a legislative majority in the state house for the first time since 1952. Nuñez was defeated for reelection in 2016 by former Las Cruces City Councilor Nathan P. Small.

References

1935 births
Hispanic and Latino American state legislators in New Mexico
Living people
People from Roswell, New Mexico
New Mexico Democrats
New Mexico Independents
New Mexico Republicans
Members of the New Mexico House of Representatives
Mayors of places in New Mexico
21st-century American politicians